Capari is a village in North Macedonia. It was formerly a municipality center, but is now within the Bitola municipality.

Demographics
According to the 2002 census, the village had a total of 493 inhabitants. Ethnic groups in the village include:

Macedonians 493

References

External links
 www.capari.org -- A website devoted to bringing the rich culture, history and beauty of the Macedonian village of Capari to the world.
 www.facebook.com/Capari.Macedonia -- Facebook Page for Capari.

Villages in Bitola Municipality